The Painten Formation is a geologic formation in Germany. It preserves fossils dating back to the Tithonian stage of the Late Jurassic period.

Description 
It is roughly contemporary with the Altmühltal Formation (which includes the true Solnhofen limestone), as they both underlay the Mörnsheim Formation. The 12th specimen, or "Schamhaupten specimen", of Archaeopteryx was uncovered in the lower portion of the Painten Formation. Other dinosaurs found here include Juravenator, Ostromia and possibly Compsognathus.

Fossil content 
The following fossils have been reported from the formation:

Reptiles 

 Dakosaurus maximus
 Eurysternum wagleri
 Juravenator starki
 Leptosaurus pulchellus
 Solnhofia parsonsi
 Archaeopteryx sp.
 Rhamphorhynchus sp.
 Eurysternidae indet.
 Ichthyosauria indet.
 Pterodactyloidea indet.

Fish 
Chondrichthyes
 Paracestracion viohli
Osteichthyes

 Anaethalion zapporum
 Ascalabothrissops voelkli
 Scheenstia zappi
 Undina pencillata
 Voelklichthys comitatus
 Allothrissops sp.
 Gyrodus sp.
 Leptolepis sp.
 ?Elopsomolos sp.

Invertebrates 
Echinoids
 Pygaster sp.
 Echinoidea indet.
Crinoids
 Saccocoma tenella
 Millericrinus sp.
Corals
 Muensteria vermicularis
 Scleractinia indet.

Flora 

 Crescentiella morronensis
 Cycadopteris jurensis
 Araucarites sp.
 Brachyphyllum sp.
 Goniolina sp.
 Sphenopteris sp.
 Phaeophyceae indet.

See also 
 List of fossiliferous stratigraphic units in Germany

References

Bibliography 
    
 
 
 
 
 

Geologic formations of Germany
Jurassic System of Europe
Jurassic Germany
Tithonian Stage
Limestone formations
Mudstone formations
Lagoonal deposits
Shallow marine deposits
Fossiliferous stratigraphic units of Europe
Paleontology in Germany
Formations